Serhiy Volodymyrovych Haidai (born 6 November 1975) is a Ukrainian entrepreneur and politician. He was the head of the Luhansk Regional Military–Civil Administration from 25 October 2019 to 15 March 2023.

Biography 
He also graduated from the National Academy for Public Administration under the President of Ukraine.

From 2005 to 2015, Haidai was the General Director of Dembud LLC. From 2008 to 2010, he worked as an Assistant Member of the Kyiv City Council. From 2014 to 2015, Haidai worked as an Adviser to the Chairman of the Obukhiv Raion State Administration. In 2015, he was elected a Member of the Mukachevo Raion Council. From 2015 to 2018, he served as Chairman of the Mukachevo Raion State Administration.

During the 2022 Russian invasion of Ukraine, Haidai served as head of the Luhansk Regional Military Administration.

During the 2022 Battle of Sievierodonetsk, Haidai observed that "The Russians are using their Syrian war tactic in Sievierodonetsk. First, they try to raze a few kilometers of area with air and artillery fire and advance with ground troops. When they gain strength, they retreat and start shooting with long-range weapons. On the other hand, when they start hitting with cannons, we retreat and then return to our positions."

The Ukrainian Cabinet of Ministers agreed to dismiss Haidai from his position on 14 March 2023, along with the governors of Odesa and Khmelnytskyi oblasts. Haidai was dismissed as Governor by Presidential decree on 15 March 2023.

References

External links 
 

1975 births
Living people
People from Sievierodonetsk
National Academy of State Administration alumni
21st-century Ukrainian businesspeople
Governors of Luhansk Oblast
Independent politicians in Ukraine
21st-century Ukrainian politicians
People of the 2022 Russian invasion of Ukraine